The  Leven Football Association (LFA) was an Australian rules football competition in Tasmania, Australia. Four clubs from small communities in northern Tasmania competed for the premiership every year. The games were played on Saturday and both matches were at the same ground in the form of a double-header. Having gone into recess for the 2016 season, the LFA folded in October 2016 after 92 years as a football league.

History
Founded 1924 to provide a competition for teams in the Ulverstone Municipality.

This Association succeeded various earlier Associations, it has been a valuable feeder ground for NWFU and NTFL clubs in particular Ulverstone.

Forth won the first premiership of the competition in 1924. Several clubs started in this association before moving into a stronger competition after establishing themselves, Turners Beach and West Ulverstone are now both in the NWFA however Railton and Mole Creek both moved the other way.

The association went into recess when Upper Castra couldn't field a side for the 2016 season. The association was supposed to be absorbed by the NWFL and be its Central Division.

Clubs

Premiers

1924 FORTH 
1925 ULVERSTONE JUNIORS 
1926 UPPER CASTRA 
1927 PRESTON 
1928 MOTTON ROVERS 
1929 PRESTON 
1930 UPPER CASTRA 
1931 PRESTON 
1932 PRESTON 
1933 PRESTON 
1934 MOTTON ROVERS 
1935 MOTTON ROVERS 
1936 MOTTON ROVERS 
1937 MOTTON ROVERS 
1938 MOTTON ROVERS 
1939 MOTTON ROVERS 
1940 MOTTON ROVERS 
1941 COMPETITION SUSPENDED DUE TO WWII
1942 COMPETITION SUSPENDED DUE TO WWII
1943 COMPETITION SUSPENDED DUE TO WWII
1944 SPRENT 
1945 FORTH 
1946 MOTTON ROVERS 
1947 WESTERN JUNIORS 
1948 WESTERN JUNIORS 
1949 WESTERN JUNIORS 
1950 MOTTON ROVERS 
1951 MOTTON ROVERS 
1952 MOTTON ROVERS 
1953 GUNNS PLAINS 
1954 MOTTON ROVERS 
1955 PRESTON 
1956 PRESTON 
1957 PRESTON 
1958 PRESTON 
1959 PRESTON 
1960 ULVERSTONE THIRDS 
1961 KINDRED 
1962 SPRENT 
1963 ULVERSTONE THIRDS 
1964 PRESTON 
1965 UPPER CASTRA 
1966 ULVERSTONE JUNIORS 
1967 UPPER CASTRA 
1968 ULVERSTONE JUNIORS 
1969 MOTTON PRESTON 
1970 ULVERSTONE JUNIORS 
1971 SOUTH RIANA 
1972 TURNERS BEACH 
1973 TURNERS BEACH 
1974 TURNERS BEACH 
1975 MOTTON PRESTON 
1976 SPRENT 
1977 SPRENT 
1978 SPRENT 
1979 SPRENT 
1980 CASTRA 
1981 SPRENT 
1982 MOTTON ROVERS 
1983 GAWLER
1984 CASTRA 
1985 CASTRA 
1986 MOTTON ROVERS 
1987 MOTTON ROVERS 
1988 CASTRA 
1989 MERSEY VALLEY WORKERS CLUB 
1990 RAILTON 
1991 RAILTON 
1992 RAILTON 
1993 MOTTON ROVERS 
1994 RAILTON 
1995 RAILTON 
1996 ZEEHAN 
1997 RAILTON 
1998 RAILTON 
1999 RAILTON 
2000 DEVONPORT SAINTS 
2001 RAILTON 
2002 RAILTON 
2003 RAILTON 
2004 MOLE CREEK 
2005 RAILTON 
2006 MOLE CREEK 
2007 RAILTON 
2008 MOLE CREEK 
2009 RAILTON
2010 MOLE CREEK 
2011 MOLE CREEK
2012 MEANDER VALLEY
2013 MOLE CREEK
2014 UPPER CASTRA
2015 RAILTON

2011 Ladder

2012 Ladder

2013 Ladder

2014 Ladder

Leading Goal Kickers

Web site
 Official Association Site

Published books
Australian rules football in Tasmania, John Stoward, 2002,

References

Defunct Australian rules football competitions in Tasmania